La Roda is a small city and municipality located in the Province of Albacete in the autonomous community of Castile-La Mancha in Spain.

Description
The town has a population of around 16,500 people. It is an important industrial town. Its most famous building is the church which dates from the 15th century.

Its main culinary speciality are the Miguelitos. Tennis player Guillermo García López hails and David Castro triathlon runner from La Roda.

See also
Church of El Salvador o de la Transfiguración

References

Municipalities of the Province of Albacete